The 1932 dismissal of Premier Jack Lang by New South Wales Governor Philip Game was the first real constitutional crisis in Australia. Lang remains the only Australian premier to be removed from office by his governor, using the reserve powers of the Crown.

Background 
Early in 1931 Jack Lang released his own plan to combat the Great Depression in Australia; this became known as "the Lang Plan". This was in contrast to the "Melbourne Agreement", later known as the Premiers' Plan, which all other state governments and the federal government had agreed to in 1930. Lang believed that the Depression was essentially caused by overseas bankers who were greedy for even more money and that this deflationary plan would only secure their wealth.

Key points of the Lang Plan included the reduction of interest owed by Australian governments on debts within Australia to 3%, the cancellation of interest payments to overseas bondholders and financiers on government borrowings, the injection of more funds into the nation's money supply as central bank credit for the revitalisation of industry and commerce, and the abolition of the Gold Standard, to be replaced by a "Goods Standard," whereby the amount of currency in circulation would be fixed to the amount of goods produced within the Australian economy. The banks had indicated that if he paid the interest they would advance him an additional amount which was greater than the interest, thus giving him a positive cash flow.

Lang was totally opposed to the Premiers' Plan agreed to by the federal Labor government of James Scullin and all the other premiers, which called for even more stringent cuts to government spending to balance the budget. In October 1931 Lang's followers in the Australian House of Representatives crossed the floor to vote with the conservative United Australia Party (UAP) and bring down the Scullin government. This action split the NSW Labor Party in two – Lang's followers became known as Lang Labor, while Scullin's supporters, led by Chifley, became known in NSW as Federal Labor. Most of the party's branches and affiliated trade unions supported Lang.

When the United Australia Party Government of Joseph Lyons came to federal power in January 1932, it passed the Financial Agreement Enforcement Act, forcing the NSW government to adhere to its debt commitments and to cut government spending. In response, Lang withdrew all the state's funds from government bank accounts so that the federal government could not gain access to the money. Governor Game advised Lang that in his view this action was illegal, and that if Lang did not reverse it he would dismiss the government. Lang stood firm, and issued a leaflet in defiance of Game. Game then reluctantly decided to exercise his reserve powers and called Lang to Government House to dismiss him.  

Gerald Stone, in his book 1932, states that there is evidence that Lang considered arresting the governor to prevent the governor from dismissing him. The possibility of this was sufficiently high that the armed forces of the Commonwealth, who would have come to the assistance of the governor, were put on alert.

Dismissal and result 
On 13 May 1932, Game dismissed Lang's government, and appointed UAP leader Bertram Stevens as Premier. Stevens formed a coalition with Michael Bruxner's Country Party, and immediately called an election at which he defeated Lang's NSW Labor Party in a landslide, with the NSW Labor Party losing 31 seats.

This was the first case of an Australian government with the confidence of the lower house of Parliament being dismissed by a vice-regal representative, the second (and as of 2022, most recent) case being when Governor-General Sir John Kerr dismissed Gough Whitlam's government on 11 November 1975.

Game himself felt his decision was the right one, despite his personal liking of Lang. He wrote to his mother-in-law on 2 July 1932: "Still with all his faults of omission and commission I had and still have a personal liking for Lang and a great deal of sympathy for his ideals and I did not at all relish being forced to dismiss him. But I felt faced with the alternative of doing so or reducing the job of Governor all over the Empire to a farce." Lang himself, despite objecting to his dismissal, conceded that he too liked Game, regarding him as fair and polite, and having had good relations with him.

See also 
 1975 Australian constitutional crisis

References

notes 

New South Wales
Political controversies in Australia
New South Wales
New South Wales
1930s in New South Wales